Trunk 10 is part of the Canadian province of Nova Scotia's system of Trunk Highways.

Route description

From Bridgewater, Trunk 10 runs in a northwesterly direction along the east bank of the LaHave River through Northfield and the village of New Germany, crossing the river near Cherryfield at the community of Meiseners Section. The route continues northwest by lakes, forests, Christmas tree farms, and cottages and through the villages of Springfield and Albany Cross, where it turns north and follows the Nictaux River near its west bank, to the route's end in the town of Middleton.

The section between Springfield and Albany Cross follows the route of the Old Annapolis Road.

Major intersections

References

010
010
010
Bridgewater, Nova Scotia
Middleton, Nova Scotia